Cranbrook School (formerly Queen Elizabeth's Grammar School) is a co-educational state funded boarding and day grammar school in the market town of Cranbrook, Kent, England.

Selection is made of pupils at age 11 and 13.

History
The school was founded after the death of John Blubery, a yeoman of the King's Armoury. In his will he decreed that if the child of his daughter be a girl, then his mansion house be turned into a free school for the poor children of Cranbrook. Queen Elizabeth I granted the school charter in 1574, which is now housed in the library.

Recent history
In 2003 alumnus Piers Sellers, a NASA astronaut, took a copy of the school charter into space with him. A photo is exhibited in the school cafeteria. In 2005 Sellers opened the school's observatory, which is named after him. This observatory houses the 22.5-inch Alan Young telescope operated by the Cranbrook and District Science and Astronomy Society (CADSAS). In May 2010 Sellers took into outer space aboard the Space Shuttle an original watercolour portrait of Cranbrook School painted by Brenda Barratt. The painting was later returned to the school with official NASA verification that it has travelled into space. In 2018, a new day house specifically for the 120 students in Years 7 and 8 was named after Sellers. The sellers house will have 180 students in the future.

Campus

Barham House
Barham House is the school's main office. It contains the reception room, the offices of both the headmaster and the deputy head, and meeting rooms. The school medical centre is also in Barham House, but has its own reception and entrance. The building was originally the local vicarage.

The Library
Central to the school, there is a large library which is one of the oldest parts of the school. It was once the school hall, but it was converted to the library after the number of pupils became too big to fit in the hall. School assemblies are currently held in the local church, St Dunstan's, or the Queen's Hall Theatre. The library also plays host to the original royal charter provided to the school by Queen Elizabeth I in 1588. In 2019, the roof of The Library fell through, meaning it had to be closed for renovations and reopened in November 2022.

Queen's Hall Theatre
The school is home to the local theatre, the Queen's Hall. It is used for a number of both internal (performed and organised by students) and external productions, as well as some school assemblies. Many external productions are performed by Cranbrook Operatic and Dramatic Society (CODS). The school has its own technical team who help with most internal productions.

Houses
Since September 2019, the school has five day houses and six boarding houses. Each house works in conjunction with the main school to provide pastoral care and academic support.

Boys' boarding houses
 Cornwallis 
 Crowden
 Rammell
 School Lodge (only for Year Nine boys)

Girls' boarding houses
 Blubery
 Scott

Day houses
 Allan House, formerly split:
 Allan Boys
 Allan Girls
Horsley House, formerly split:
 Horsley Boys
 Horsley Girls
Webster House, formerly split:
 Webster Boys
 Webster Girls
 Lynx
 Sellers (Junior School)

Notable Old Cranbrookians

 General Sir John Akehurst KCB CBE, Deputy Supreme Allied Commander, Europe from 1987 to 1990, and President from 1991 to 1999 of the United Kingdom Reserve Forces Association
 Sir Anthony Barnes Atkinson, Professor of Economics at the University of Oxford
 Air Chief Marshal Sir John Barraclough CB CBE, Station Commander of RAF Biggin Hill from 1954 to 1956
 Emma Biggs, mosaic artist
 Hugo Burnham, drummer for the English rock group Gang of Four and associate professor at the New England Institute of Art
 Jon Cleary, Grammy award-winning musician
 Canon John Collins, radical clergyman and political campaigner
 Michael Croucher TV film producer
 Barry Davies, sports commentator
 Louise Dean, novelist
 Phil Edmonds, cricketer
 Dr Henry Ford (professor) Professor of Arabic and Principal of Magdalen Hall, Oxford 
 Karin Giannone, journalist and news presenter at BBC News
 Henri Gillet, Professor of Mathematics at the University of Illinois at Chicago
 Harry Hill (Dr. Matthew Hall), comedian
 Sir Victor Horsley, pioneering neurosurgeon
 Wing Commander Sir Norman Hulbert, Conservative MP from 1935 to 1950 for Stockport from 1935 to 1950, and for Stockport North from 1950 to 1964
 Arthur Surridge Hunt, papyrologist
 Prof Richard L. Hunter, Regius Professor of Greek at the University of Cambridge since 2001
 Hammond Innes, novelist
 Wing Commander Hugh Kennard, World War II pilot and later civilian aviator
 Kevin Lygo, television executive and Director of Television and Content since 2007 of Channel 4
 Ruaridh McConnochie, Silver Medal-winning member of the Great Britain national rugby sevens team at the 2016 Olympics and England Rugby Union player
 Richard Middleton, poet and short-story writer
 Brian Moore, football commentator
 Sir David Muirhead CMG CVO, Ambassador to Belgium from 1974 to 1978, to Portugal from 1970 to 1974, and to Peru from 1967 to 1970
 Tony Nicklinson, Right-to-die campaigner with Locked-In Syndrome
 Stuart Organ, actor
 Colonel Mike Osborn DSO OBE MC, British military officer and former commander of the 22nd Special Air Service Regiment
 Richard Pilbrow, theatre producer
 William Rootes, co-founder, along with his brother, of the Rootes Group car manufacturers
 Piers Sellers, astronaut
 Professor Sir Nicholas Shackleton, FRS, distinguished earth scientist, Professor of Quaternary Palaeoclimatology from 1991 to 2004 at the University of Cambridge
 Edwin Shirley, Rock and Roll tour organiser
 Sir Tim Smit, co-founder of the Eden Project
 Andrew Soper OBE, British Ambassador to Venezuela 2017-2021
 Henri Tebbitt (1854–1927) an English-Australian painter
 Air Vice-Marshal Sir John Weston CB OBE, Station Commander of RAF Halton from 1952 to 1953
 Peter West, television presenter
 Sir Charles Wheeler CMG, BBC journalist
 Jacqueline Winspear, author
 Wallace Duffield Wright, VC recipient

See also
 Cranbrook Schools, a private school in Bloomfield Hills, Michigan, named after the town of Cranbrook, Kent.  It has an exchange programme with Cranbrook School, Kent.
 Cranbrook School, Sydney, an independent, day and boarding school for boys in Sydney, New South Wales, originated in 'Cranbrook House', the family home of the Tooth brewing family of Cranbrook, Kent, and Sydney

References

 Duncan H. Robinson, Cranbrook School - A Brief history, 1972
 Nigel Nicolson, Cranbrook School - An Illustrated History 1518-1974, 1974

External links
 School website
 EduBase

News items
Telegraph July 2008

Grammar schools in Kent
1518 establishments in England
Educational institutions established in the 1510s
Boarding schools in Kent
Schools with a royal charter
State funded boarding schools in England
Academies in Kent
Cranbrook, Kent